Bachok District (Jawi: باچوق ) is an administrative division (or jajahan) of Kelantan, Malaysia. It is located approximately 25 km east of Kota Bharu.

The population is predominantly Malay, with Chinese and Siamese minorities. Bachok Town is the center of administration, business, and transportation of the district. The economy is mostly supported by agriculture, with significant fishing activity as well.

Bachok Town or Bandar Bachok was recently declared an Islamic Tourism Town or Bandar Pelancongan Islam by the incumbent Menteri Besar of Kelantan, Tuan Guru Hj. Datuk Nik Abdul Aziz Nik Mat effective 7 December 2010.

Name origin

The origin of the name "Bachok" has several versions.

One version claims Bachok was named after a person named Tok Bachok, who people believed to be the first settler in the area. Traders from China traveled to Pengkalan Cina of Bachok to trade silk and spices.

The popular version of the name's origin, according to local inhabitants, originates from two Siamese words, Ban and Chak: Ban means village and Chak means nipa (a native mangrove plant). The local Siamese call the place Ban Chak, referring to the more populated and possibly earlier settlement immediately to the south of Bachok Town, the actual Kampung Nipah today. Bachok Town was possibly part of the larger Kampung Nipah then. The pronunciation of Ban Chak was later invariably changed to Bachok to suit the local Malay accent.

Administrative divisions

In exercise of the powers conferred by subsection 4 (3) of the Local Government Act 1976, the State Authority in consultation with the Minister of Housing and Local Government and the Secretary of the Election Commission hereby after the boundaries of Bachok District Council as the areas specified in the Schedule.

Demographics

Federal Parliament and State Assembly Seats 

List of Bachok district representatives in the Federal Parliament (Dewan Rakyat) 

List of Bachok district representatives in the State Legislative Assembly.

Economy

Kenaf Plantation

Kenaf (Hibiscus cannabinus) is a tropical plant of the mallow family that yields a fibre resembling jute that can be used for the production of cordage and textiles. Kenaf can be harvested after 120 days and its planting cycle is three seasons annually.

According to National Tobacco Board, the pioneer batch of Kenaf-growing farmers in Kelantan have proven that the crop is a good alternative to tobacco that has become less competitive in the plantation industry. It is expected to export 50,000 tonnes of Kenaf annually, valued at RM15 billion. This would make Kenaf the country's major commodity by the year 2010, he said, adding that the Republic of Korea is expected to be the first importing country for Malaysias Kenaf, at 50,000 tonnes a year.

The Kenaf-planting project, that is capable of producing 15,000 tonnes of Kenaf per hectare, provides the tobacco farmers an alternative source of income when the AFTA is enforced. Under the projects initial phase, some 1,000 hectares of land would be planted with Kenaf including 700 hectares in Kelantan. Two Kenaf-processing mills were constructed at Air Tawar in Pasir Puteh and Beris Lalang (Bachok).The mill which is equipped with RM600,000 worth of machinery is able to process 10 tonnes of Kenaf during eight hours of operations daily. The processed Kenaf is exported to Germany and Korea.

Places of interest

Pantai Irama ( The Beach of Melody) 

This beach is facing the South China Sea with wide and long sandy beach. Pantai Irama (Beach of Melody) is popular among the locals and visitors and hence, during the weekends (Friday and Saturday), the beach will be packed with family and children. It is also a common place to hold concerts and events. It is situated along the main road of Bachok, Kota Bahru.

Pantai Kemayang 

This beach is facing the South China Sea and is only 14 kilometres from Kota Bharu. It is connected by a good road network and has public toilets, a surau and various eateries. Most of its visitors are families but singles come here as well.

Bukit Marak 

Bukit Marak (literally Shining Hill) is a village in Bachok, Kelantan, Malaysia, located about 24 kilometres (15 mi) south of the state capital Kota Bharu. It was the childhood home of Puteri Saadong, and thus has significance in the history of the Sultanate of Kelantan.

The village derives its name from a local hill, one of the last hillocks in the district. The hill has some attractions for tourists, and draws thousands of visitors every weekend both for hiking and for sightseeing. Among these are a pool in which Puteri Saadong was believed to have bathed, and three granite rocks at the peak of the hill resembling Puteri Saadong's favourite musical instrument. However, the hill is being negatively affected by excavation of soil for use in land reclamation; local villagers are said to be selling soil from the hill at RM40 for one lorry-load. Aside from the damage to the historical site, this also may introduce the danger of mudslides and landslides during the monsoon season. The state government has offered to purchase the hill from its owners in accordance with the National Heritage Act 2005, in order to prevent further damage.

Kandis Resource Centre 

Founded by the late Rashiddin Nik Nik Hussein and formally established in 2000. KRC many treasures of art-oriented Malay carving art langkasuka tombstone grave, rehal, pulpit, wall decor, architecture mosques and palaces of the east coast of Malaysia and Patani, Thailand is unique with its own motives.

Kampung Balai 

Kampung Balai is a village in Bachok located approximately 20 kilometers southeast of Kota Bharu. While ‘’Balai’’ means ‘’hall’’ in Malay, there is no known historical correlation between the village and ‘’hall’’. However, according to local inhabitants, “Balai” is derived from ‘’Ban Malai” or ‘’flower village’’ in Thai language. It is believed that the low-lying area where the rice field was, now planted with tobacco, was once a shallow lake filled with flowering lotus.

The Thais of this village are believed to be originated from central Thailand more than 200 years ago when Kelantan was a tributary of the Kingdom of Siam. Their spoken Thai language is distinctly different from other Thais in Kelantan who generally speak the southern “Tak Bai” Thai language.

The village was most probably opened by these Thais or the Chinese.

The Chinese, mostly from Fujian, China came to the village probably at the same time with the Thais to develop the village. Some of the Chinese are of eighth or ninth generation descendants. Virtually all of them have lost contact with their ancestral roots in China.
Demographics

The lingua franca among the villagers is mainly Thai although all the Chinese and most of the Thais could also speak, to some degree of competency, Kelantan Hokkien (Min Nan). All of them are fluent Malay speakers and some, especially the younger generation, could converse in Mandarin as well. They are predominantly Buddhists. The Chinese also observe traditional Chinese practices.

There are three Buddhist temples in the village, i.e. Wat Phathumviharn, Wat Phithikyan Phutthaktham and a Kuan Yin temple located at seaside facing the South China Sea.

Wat Phithikyan Phutthaktham 

It is better known simply as Wat Balai or Dragon Temple to the locals, on account of the pair of dragons flanking the entrance.

Wat Phothikyan Phutthaktham began as a modest temple some twenty years ago. It became more active when a Thai came over and started various activities, including initiating a building fund for the temple. As a result, it underwent massive expansion in recent years, including the construction of a 100-foot tall statue of a standing Buddha. Other sights at Wat Phothikyan Phutthaktham include the wishing three, where devotees threw their wishes onto its branches, and the seated Buddha image behind a seven-headed naga.

The small towns of Beris Kubor Besar (kg Pak Pura), Perupok, Jelawat and Wakaf Zin have wet markets and competitive grocery prices.

Education

Tertiary Education 
 Universiti Malaysia Kelantan
 Islamic College of Science & Technology (Malay: Kolej Islam, Sains dan Teknologi (KIST))
 Institute of Ocean and Earth Sciences ('IOES') Bachok Marine Research Station - is established in 2012. Built on a land area of 3 hectares, the station fronts the open sea (South China Sea) and is partially bounded by the narrow Rekang River. It is also an hour away from Perhentian Island, which is ideal for coral reef studies
 Institut Kemahiran Belia Negara Daerah Bachok
 Pusat Giatmara Daerah Bachok
 Pejabat Pelajaran Daerah Bachok

Pondok Institutions 
 Pusat Pengajian Pondok Kg Telong, Kandis
 Madrasah Islahiyah, Pondok Kuin Pasir

Secondary Education 

 Sek. Men. Keb. Bachok
 Sek. Men. Keb. Badak
 Sek. Men. Keb. Beris Panchor
 Sek. Men. Keb. Dato' Perdana
 Sek. Men. Keb. Jelawat
 Sek. Men. Keb. Kandis
 Sek. Men. Keb. Kubang Telaga
 Sek. Men. Keb. Long Yunus
 Sek. Men. Keb. Pak Badol
 Sek. Men. Keb. Putri Saadong
 Sek. Men. Keb. Sri Gunong
 Sek. Men. Keb. Sri Nipah
 Sek. Men. Keb. Teknik Bachok
 Sek. Men . Keb. Kubang golok

Secondary Religious School

 Sek. Men. Keb. Agama Tok Bachok
 Maahad Amir Indra Petra
 Sek. Men. Ugama Yaakubiah
 Sek. Men. Ugama Muhammadiah
 Sek. Men. Ugama Al Hidayah Islamiah
 Sek. Men. Ugama Beris Lalang

Primary Education 

 Sek. Keb Seri Kemudi
 Sek. Keb Tangok
 Sek. Keb Alor Bakat
 Sek. Keb Bachok
 Sek. Keb Badak
 Sek. Keb Bakong
 Sek. Keb Bekelam
 Sek. Keb Beris Kubur Besar
 Sek. Keb Lalang
 Sek. Keb Beris Panchor
 Sek. Keb Bukit Marak
 Sek. Keb Chantum
 Sek. Keb Gunong
 Sek. Keb Jelawat
 Sek. Keb Kampong Chap
 Sek. Keb Kandis
 Sek. Keb Keting
 Sek. Keb Kolam]
 Sek. Keb Kubang Telaga
 Sek. Keb Kucelong
 Sek. Keb Pak Badol
 Sek. Keb Pa' Pura
 Sek. Keb Pantai Senak
 Sek. Keb Pauh Sembilan
 Sek. Keb Pengkalan Chengal
 Sek. Keb Perupok
 Sek. Keb Seneng
 Sek. Keb Sri Kemunting
 Sek. Keb Sungai Dua
 Sek. Keb Tanjong Jenera
 Sek. Keb Tawang
 Sek. Keb Telaga Ara
 Sek. Keb Pa'Pura

Climate
Bachok has a tropical rainforest climate (Af) with moderate rainfall from February to May and heavy to very heavy rainfall in the remaining months.

Notable people

Actors
Osman Kering

Government & Politics
 Annuar Musa
 Mustapa Mohamed
Datuk Dr. Awang Adek Hussin

 Writers
Lim Swee Tin

References

External links
 Bachok District Land and District Office
 Bachok District Council